Falemai Lesa is a Samoan national resident in New Zealand who famously appealed her visa overstay conviction to the Judicial Committee of the Privy Council, then the highest court of appeal in New Zealand.

Lesa v Attorney-General of New Zealand

Her case Lesa v Attorney-General of New Zealand, in which she pressed her claim to be a New Zealand citizen, is a key legal case and had considerable impact on Samoans and New Zealand Law. The Privy Council ruled in July 1982 that all Western Samoans born between 1924 and 1948 were British subjects, and that under the British Nationality and New Zealand Citizenship Act 1948 from 1 January 1949 they and their descendants had become New Zealand citizens.

One of the results of this ruling was the controversial decision by the Muldoon National government to pass the New Zealand Citizenship and Western Samoa Act 1982 which effectively rescinded and annulled any citizenship claims by Samoans living in Samoa in retrospect. Lesa herself (who is named in the Act) was granted New Zealand citizenship.

Her barristers were George Rosenberg and Dr. George Paterson Barton, Q.C., from Wellington, who both acted in a number of prominent cases affecting Samoans.

The case continues to generate controversy and spur efforts to amend the immigration and nationality laws in New Zealand.

See also

 Third National Government of New Zealand
 New Zealand nationality law

References 

Year of birth missing (living people)
Living people
Place of birth missing (living people)
Samoan expatriates in New Zealand
Law of New Zealand
New Zealand–Samoa relations
New Zealand and the Commonwealth of Nations
Samoa and the Commonwealth of Nations